Knoxville Downtown Island Airport or Knoxville Downtown Island Home Airport , often referred to as Island Home Airport, is a general aviation airport located approximately one-half mile east of downtown Knoxville, in Knox County, Tennessee, United States.

This airport is included in the National Plan of Integrated Airport Systems for 2011–2015, which categorized it as a reliever airport. Although most U.S. airports use the same three-letter location identifier for the FAA and IATA, this airport is assigned DKX by the FAA, but has no designation from the IATA.

History 
Downtown Island Airport was established in 1930 by Tom Kesterson as a makeshift facility named Island Airport, located on Dickinson's Island in the Tennessee River. Kesterson was one of Knoxville's earliest aviators. He hoped that the private airport, which had a  runway, would attract commercial air service to Knoxville. In July 1934, American Airlines established a mail route that stopped at Island Airport en route to Washington D.C. and New York City. Passenger service from Knoxville to Washington D.C. was also offered on two daily flights on planes that carried up to eight passengers. Regular airline service to Knoxville was initiated on January 15, 1936.

During the 1930s and 1940s, the airport site was used both for aviation and farming. In 1941, the airport hangar was sold to Ferris Thomas, and in 1942 the operations were sold to Elmer Wood. In 1943, H.F. Wattenbarger purchased the property for use as a farm, but that same year he began leasing the airport for wartime training of 300 Army Air Cadets. After the training program ended, Wattenbarger resumed operation as a private airport and farm. Robert Campbell, owner and operator of Campbell's Aero Service, became the airport's primary operator in the late 1940s, continuing for nearly two decades.

Evelyn Johnson, holder of the Guinness Book of Records entry for most hours logged by a woman pilot and most hours logged by a living pilot, started flying at Knoxville Island Home Airport in 1944. She recalls that she had to travel by rowboat to reach the airport.

The airport became a public aviation facility in 1963 under the ownership of the City of Knoxville. In 1978, it was transferred to the ownership of Metropolitan Knoxville Airport Authority, its current owner and operator.

Facilities and aircraft 
Knoxville Downtown Island Airport covers an area of 200 acres (81 ha) at an elevation of 833 feet (254 m) above mean sea level. It has one asphalt paved runway designated 8/26 which measures 3,499 by 75 feet (1,066 x 23 m).

For the 12-month period ending October 21, 2009, the airport had 82,456 aircraft operations, an average of 225 per day: 99% general aviation, 1% air taxi, and <1% military. At that time, there were 102 aircraft based at this airport: 78% single-engine, 17% multi-engine, 5% helicopter, and 1% glider.

DKX operates as an uncontrolled field. Up until 2007, a tower existed at the field. The tower was in service during World War II but in later years was staffed only during times of expected high traffic, such as Saturday UT football games in nearby Neyland Stadium.  Due to asbestos in the cab, it was quarantined and later demolished by the airport authority; a new tower is under consideration.

References

External links
 
 Airport information from Metropolitan Knoxville Airport Authority
 Aerial image as of March 1997 from USGS The National Map
 
 

Airports in Tennessee
Buildings and structures in Knoxville, Tennessee
Economy of Knoxville, Tennessee
Transportation in Knoxville, Tennessee
Airports established in 1930
1930 establishments in Tennessee